The Villa La Pelucca frescoes are a c. 1520–1523 cycle of frescos by Bernardino Luini, commissioned by the Milanese nobleman Gerolamo Rabia for his villa near Monza, known as 'La Pelucca'. Most of the surviving fragments are in the Pinacoteca di Brera in Milan, though others are in the Wallace Collection in London, the Louvre in Paris, the Musée Condé in Chantilly and other private collections. Stylistically they shown the influence of Bramantino - Women Bathing the figure's shoulders is a homage to the Trivulzio Tapestries, particularly February from that cycle.

History
In the Napoleonic era the villa was used by viceroy Eugene de Beauharnais, before passing into the lands of the Kingdom of Lombardy–Venetia in 1816. Shortly after that it was sold to private owners. The frescoes were removed between 1821 and 1822 by Stefano Barezzi, who transferred them to canvas supports, leading to several cracks which are still visible. Vast pieces of the cycle are lost, particularly those relating to the framing architecture, irredeemably altering the legibility of the cycle.

Known scenes
Measurements in cm.

Pinacoteca di Brera
Knight, 165x133
Family of Satyrs Sacrificing to Pan, 176x147
Scene of Metamorphoses, 167x156
Celebration of Passover, 117x173
Death of the Firstborn, 211x169
Preparations for the Departure of the Jews, 275x170
The Egyptians' Gifts to the Jews, 149x120
The Jews' Song of Triumph, 243x143
Gathering the Manna, 200x145
Bust of a Girl, 47x37
Pair of Young Men, 53x61
The Game of the Golden Cushion, 140x100
Mythological Scene, with the Birth of Adonis in the Background, 208x193
Girls Bathing, 135x235
Three Harvesting Putti, 50x72, 60x65, 60x72
Angels Carrying the Body of St Catherine of Alexandria, 123x228
The Egyptian Army Drowned in the Red Sea, 179x168
The Egyptian Army Submerged in the Red Sea, 130x170
Vulcan's Forge, 240x163
Moses Striking the Rock, 122x173
Moses Praying, 68x50
God the Father Blessing
Adoring Angel

Wallace Collection
Harvesting Putto, lunette, 49,2x64
Head of a Woman, 48,4x35,6

Musée Condé
Harvesting Putto, lunette fragment, 32x41
Bust of a Woman, 29x30

Private collections
Adoring Angel

References

1520s paintings
Paintings in the Louvre by Italian artists
Paintings in the collection of the Pinacoteca di Brera
Paintings in the collection of the Musée Condé
Paintings in the Wallace Collection
Fresco paintings in Milan
Fresco paintings in France
Fresco paintings in the United Kingdom
Paintings by Bernardino Luini
Paintings depicting Greek myths
Paintings depicting Hebrew Bible themes
Paintings depicting figures from the Book of Genesis